Five Days In Paris is a 1995 fiction novel by Danielle Steel and published by Delacorte Press. It analyzes honour, integrity and commitment into relationships, as well as hope. The book was a best-seller of Publishers Weekly for eighteen weeks.

Plot
The story follows two Americans, Peter Haskell, a man with a strong career and family and Olivia Thatcher, two citizens from different backgrounds and cultures who meet in the Ritz in Paris, France on the night of a bomb threat. The latter character is a woman who is unhappily married to a leading senator, and the first being the president of a significant pharmaceutical empire.

References

External links
 Five Days In Paris on Google Books

1995 American novels
American romance novels
Novels by Danielle Steel
Novels set in Paris
Delacorte Press books
Contemporary romance novels